Crawford Township is a township in Crawford County, Kansas, USA.  As of the 2010 census, its population was 928.

Geography
Crawford Township covers an area of  surrounding the city of Girard.  According to the USGS, it contains one cemetery, Girard.

The streams of Clear Creek and Elm Creek run through this township.

Transportation
Crawford Township contains one airport or landing strip, Harport Landing Field.

References

 USGS Geographic Names Information System (GNIS)

External links
 US-Counties.com
 City-Data.com

Townships in Crawford County, Kansas
Townships in Kansas